Ella Sheppard (February 4, 1851 – June 9, 1914) was an American soprano, pianist, composer, and arranger of Negro Spirituals. She was the matriarch of the original Fisk Jubilee Singers of Nashville, Tennessee. She also played the organ and the guitar. Sheppard was a friend and confidante of African-American activists and orators Booker T. Washington and Frederick Douglass.

Early life and education
A direct descendant of Andrew Jackson, Samuella "Ella" Sheppard was born on The Hermitage, Jackson's plantation. Sheppard's father Simon hired himself out as a Nashville liveryman and hack driver. This enabled him to earn $1,800 allowing him to pay for his own freedom. Sarah Hannah Sheppard, Ella's mother, was promised that her freedom could be purchased by Simon, but the slave mistress reneged on the agreement. "Sarah shall never belong to Simon," she declared. "She is mine and she shall die mine. Let Simon get another wife." Fed-up with slave life, Sarah threatened that she'd rather "...take Ella and jump into the river than see her a slave." Legend says that Ella's mother took her to the riverbank to carry out the threat, but an elderly slave woman prevented her, saying, "Don’t do it, Honey! Don’t you see God’s chariot a-comin’ down from Heaven? Let the chariot of the Lord swing low. This child is gonna stand before kings and queens! The Lord would have need of that child." Sarah took the woman's advice, walked back up the hill to slavery with Ella in her arms. Fearing the loss of the child, the slave mistress allowed Simon Sheppard to purchase his own daughter for $350. When young Ella's mother was sold to a plantation in Mississippi, she stayed with her father in Nashville. He later married another enslaved woman for whom he paid $1,300 to free her.

Following an 1856 Nashville race riot, whites tightened controls on free Negroes in the area. As a result, Simon was unable to work and soon found himself in debt. Fearful of the potential seizure of his family (as assets to be sold into slavery), he fled to Cincinnati, Ohio. Ella showed exceptional musical talent. To support this talent, her father purchased a piano for his daughter, and paid a German woman to give her private music lessons. Young Ella attended a colored school in Cincinnati., and also studied with a white American teacher who gave lessons on the condition she keep it a secret. After her father's death from cholera in 1866, Ella supported herself, her stepmother and half-sister by playing for local functions, working as a maid, and teaching music in Gallatin, Tennessee.

After about five months she was only able to save a little more than $6, because the poor black pupils were not always able to pay for their lessons. She took that $6 and enrolled at the Fisk Free Colored School in Nashville, Tennessee in 1868, where her $6 lasted three weeks.

Career

Sheppard taught music in Nashville, which paid for her studies over the next two years. She was asked to teach music at the Fisk School. She was the sole black member of the staff at Fisk prior to 1875. When the treasurer of Fisk, George L. White, overheard some of the students singing the original old "plantation songs," which were not meant to be heard in public, he was so moved by these haunting melodies that he decided to have them arranged for concert performance, in European-style four-part harmony. Sheppard did most of the arranging of these works. The first tours were successful, and the Fisk Jubilee Singers were formed in 1871 to go on a national tour. Sheppard worked as the primary vocal coach and director for the group, collecting over one hundred songs for their repertoire, as well as accompanying the choir on piano, overseeing rehearsals, and conducting during performances. They sang for Mark Twain, President Ulysses S. Grant, congressmen, diplomats, and royalty. "These singers," according to one newspaper, "are doing a great work for humanity."

Sheppard was with the Jubilee Singers when the group toured Europe, including performances for the British, Dutch and German monarchs. Queen Victoria stated when she heard the group while Ella Sheppard served as their matriarch, "[The Fisk Jubilee Singers] sing so beautifully they must be from the Music City of the United States."

The original Jubilee Singers disbanded in 1878 because of their grueling touring schedule. Ella Sheppard was quoted as saying, "Our strength was failing under the ill treatment at hotels, on railroads, poorly attended concerts, and ridicule." As violence against African-Americans grew in the South, it was deemed unsafe for women to travel with the group. A male quartet called the Fisk Jubilee Quartet was formed to carry on the tradition of the Spirituals in concert form.

Marriage
Sheppard was wed to George Washington Moore in 1882. He was a prominent minister known for his contributions to the American Missionary Association. She eventually found her mother in Mississippi and brought her back to Nashville to live in her home.

George Sheppard Moore, a doctor, was one of their sons and Clinton the other.

Legacy
On November 17, 2009, the Ella Sheppard School of Music was founded by Chicago Native and former Fisk Jubilee Singer George Cooper — who studied piano with Matthew Kennedy, director of the Fisk Jubilee Singers from 1957 to 1986 — with the blessing of Ella Sheppard's great granddaughter Beth Howse. Since its inception, the school has provided free musical instruction to hundreds of children ages 2–14 on Chicago's West Side.

References

External links
"Ella Sheppard: Jubilee Singer, Composer, Former Slave," a lecture presented by Nina Kennedy

1851 births
1914 deaths
American sopranos
Gospel music pianists
African-American pianists
African-American women composers
African-American composers
American women composers
American women music educators
Musicians from Nashville, Tennessee
Fisk University alumni
Fisk University faculty
American women academics
19th-century American women musicians
20th-century African-American women singers
19th-century women pianists
20th-century women pianists